was the name adopted by the leader of the ninja  during the Sengoku era of feudal Japan. He was retainer of Later Hōjō clan. According to some records, his name was originally Kazama Kotarō (風間 小太郎).

The Fūma clan and Fūma Kotarō
The clan was based in Kanagawa Prefecture, specializing in horseback guerrilla warfare and naval espionage. According to some sources, the family has roots in the 10th century when they served Taira no Masakado in his revolt against the Kyoto government. The use of the name started with the first leader (jonin) of the clan: originally surnamed "風間" (Fūma), with a different kanji, it was later changed to homophone 風魔. Each subsequent leader of the school adopted the same name as its founder, making it difficult to identify them individually. This school was in the service of the Hōjō clan of Odawara.

Fūma Kotarō was the fifth and the best known of the Fūma clan leaders. Born in Sagami Province (modern Kanagawa Prefecture) on an unknown date, he became notorious as the leader of a band of 200 Rappa "battle disrupters", divided into four groups: brigands, pirates, burglars and thieves. Kotarō served under Hōjō Ujimasa and Hōjō Ujinao. His biggest achievement came in 1580 at Battle of Omosu, when the Fūma ninja covertly infiltrated and attacked a camp of the Takeda clan forces under Takeda Katsuyori at night, succeeding in causing severe chaos in the camp, which resulted in massive casualties among the disoriented enemies as they attacked each other. Later In 1590, at Siege of Odawara, when Toyotomi Hideyoshi laid siege to Odawara Castle, which eventually fell, and the Hōjō clan was forced to surrender.

When the Tokugawa shogunate came to power, the remnants of Fūma-ryū were reduced to a band of brigands operating in and around Edo. A popular but fictional story says that in 1596, Kotarō was responsible for the death of Hattori Hanzō, a famous ninja in the service of Tokugawa Ieyasu, who had tracked him down in the Inland Sea, but Kotarō has succeeded in luring him into a small channel, where a tide trapped the Tokugawa gunboats and his men then set fire to the channel with oil. 

Kotarō was eventually caught by the Tokugawa shogunate's special law-enforcement force, guided by his rival and a former Takeda ninja Kōsaka Jinnai (高坂甚内), and executed through beheading by an order of Ieyasu in 1603.

In folklore and popular culture
In a folk legend, he is often an inhuman figure: a supposedly part-oni monstrous giant (over 2 meters tall) with inverted eyes. In fiction portrayals, Fūma Kotarō is often depicted as Hattori Hanzō's arch-rival. As the name Fūma literally means "wind demon", Fūma Kotarō's depiction is frequently more flamboyant, fantastical, and sometimes even demonic. In contrast, Hanzō is usually rendered with a relatively subdued appearance.

Kotarō is a player character in the video game Onimusha 2: Samurai's Destiny as a young ninja in the service of the Hōjō clan, also returning in the spin-offs Onimusha Tactics and Onimusha Soul. He is also a main character in the World Heroes fighting game series (as "Fuuma"), also featured in Neo Geo Battle Coliseum together with his main rival Hanzo. In the video game Samurai Warriors 2 and its sequels along with its spin-off series Warriors Orochi, he is Hanzō's foe, who, despite serving the Hōjō clan, prefers chaos and continually makes trouble for many factions. He also appears in several other video games such as Fate/Grand Order (as an assassin class servant), Getsu Fūma Den, Kessen III (as an optional bonus character), Nobunaga's Ambition II, Sengoku Basara 2 (initially as a non-player character, he became playable in the Heroes edition), Sengoku Basara 3 and Sengoku Basara 4, Persona 2: Eternal Punishment (as a summonable "persona" character), Pokémon Conquest (as a playable sidequest character), Shall We Date?: Ninja Love (as a romance option or the player character), and Taikō Risshiden V (as an unlockable player character). He is further featured in the manga series Nabari no Ou, where he appears as the shape-shifting leader of the Fūma ninja village and an ally of the protagonist, and also makes an appearance in the light novel series Mirage of Blaze during the story arc involving the Hōjō clan, and in the manga and anime series Samurai Deeper Kyo, where he is Sarutobi Sasuke's childhood friend and rival, and Karasu Tengu Kabuto. Fūma Kotarō is featured in the manga Hana no Keiji: Kumo no Kanata ni; in the SNES game of the same title, he is the final opponent that Keiji Maeda has to fight against.

The anime series Sengoku Collection features a female interpretation of Kotarō, being a servant to the female version of Imagawa Yoshimoto. In the manga and anime series Laughing Under the Clouds, Fuma Kotaro is a couple of twins who both rule over a falling Fuma clan. In the manga series Yaiba, he is a revenant brought back to life by Onimaru. 

His 18th-century descendant Fūma Kotarō Kaneyoshi is the hero's nemesis through most of the TV series The Samurai. His modern descendant is a player character in the video game Ninja Commando. The Fūma clan are also featured in the TV series Shogun Iemitsu Shinobi Tabi and the video games and Inindo: Way of the Ninja. In the Soul series of video games the female ninja Taki and several minor characters including Li Long's lover Chie are a part of the Fūma clan, however in this setting the clan is depicted as being from Ōmi province rather than Sagami. Souls and Tekkens Yoshimitsu, a rival of Taki's in the Soul series, is a part of the fictitious Manji clan which is based in the Kantō region and is composed of brigands and bandits like the real Fūma clan. Characters who are modern-day descendants of the Fūma clan include title characters in the manga series Fūma no Kojirō and the anime film The Plot of the Fuma Clan, as well as two of the main characters in the manga X. In the manga and anime series Naruto, the character Pain was revealed to have a body that originated from the Fūma clan when he kills his rival Hanzō.

A fictional weapon called the Fūma shuriken is a large collapsible shuriken with four blades. In 2014, Makai Syojyo Ken held a professional wrestling event where several wrestlers performed as historical figures; during the event, Isami Kodaka performed as Fūma Kotarō.

See also
Ishikawa Goemon
Hattori Hanzo

References

1603 deaths
16th-century Japanese people
17th-century executions by Japan
17th-century Japanese people
Japanese criminals
Japanese ninjutsu practitioners
Japanese pirates
Japanese thieves
Ninja
People executed by Japan by decapitation
Year of birth unknown
Go-Hōjō clan